Joseph Spiteri (born 20 May 1959) is a Maltese prelate of the Catholic Church who works in the diplomatic service of the Holy See. He has been Apostolic Nuncio to Lebanon since March 2018.

Biography
Joseph Spiteri was born on 20 May 1959 in Sliema Malta, though the family lived in Luqa. He was the first child born to Ernest Spiteri and Emmanuela née Cassar. After attending local seminaries he was ordained a priest on 29 June 1984 by Archbishop Joseph Mercieca in St John's Co-Cathedral in Valletta. After a brief pastoral assignment, he studied at the Pontifical Ecclesiastical Academy and earned a doctorate in canon law from the Pontifical University of Saint Thomas Aquinas in 1988.

He joined the diplomatic service of the Holy See on 15 July 1988 and fulfilled assignments in Panama, Iraq, Mexico, Portugal, Greece and Venezuela, and then worked in the offices of the Secretariat of State in Rome.

He was consecrated by Cardinal Tarcisio Bertone, with the Maltese archbishops Paul Cremona and Joseph Mercieca as co-conservators, in St John's Co-Cathedral.

On 1 October 2013, Pope Francis appointed him Nuncio to the Côte d'Ivoire.

On 7 March 2018, Pope Francis named him Nuncio to Lebanon.

On 7 July 2022, Pope Francis named him Nuncio to Mexico.

See also
 List of heads of the diplomatic missions of the Holy See

References

Living people
1959 births
20th-century Maltese Roman Catholic priests
Pontifical Ecclesiastical Academy alumni
Apostolic Nuncios to Sri Lanka
Apostolic Nuncios to Ivory Coast
Apostolic Nuncios to Lebanon
21st-century Maltese Roman Catholic priests